Ischyrorhynchus is an extinct genus of probable platanistid river dolphins from South America. One species has been described, I. vanbenedeni.

References

River dolphins
Prehistoric cetacean genera